The 80th Field Artillery Regiment is a field artillery regiment of the United States Army.

Distinctive unit insignia
 Description
A Silver color metal and enamel device 1 3/32 inches (2.78 cm) in height overall consisting of a shield blazoned: Party per fess Or and Gules, a fess dancetté ermine. On a canton Sable an orle of the first (from the coat of arms of the 11th Cavalry).
 Symbolism
The dual character of the regiment is shown by the colors of the field, yellow for cavalry, red for artillery. The fess dancetté is taken from the arms of the Oglethorpe family, also the boar's head crest, which in addition is the ancient symbol of hospitality. The arms of ancient Brittany was a shield of ermine, and ermine figures prominently in the arms of Vannes; this is shown by the tincture of the fess. The parent organization is shown on the canton.
 Background
The distinctive unit insignia was originally approved for the 80th Field Artillery Regiment on 14 November 1932. It was redesignated for the 80th Field Artillery Battalion on 5 December 1942. It was redesignated for the 80th Artillery Regiment on 21 November 1958. The insignia was redesignated effective 1 September 1971, for the 80th Field Artillery Regiment.

Coat of arms
Blazon
 Shield- Party per fess Or and Gules, a fess dancetté ermine. On a canton Sable an orle of the first (from the coat of arms of the 11th Cavalry).
 Crest- On a wreath of the colors Or and Gules, a boar's head Proper.
 Motto- TOUJOURS L’AUDACE (Always Brave)
 Symbolism- The dual character of the regiment is shown by the colors of the field, yellow for cavalry, red for artillery. The fess dancetté is taken from the arms of the Oglethorpe family, also the boar's head crest, which in addition is the ancient symbol of hospitality. The arms of ancient Brittany was a shield of ermine, and ermine figures prominently in the arms of Vannes; this is shown by the tincture of the fess. The parent organization is shown on the canton.
 Background- The coat of arms was originally approved for the 80th Field Artillery Regiment on 24 March 1920. It was amended to correct the motto on 20 September 1921. It was redesignated for the 80th Field Artillery Battalion on 5 December 1942. It was redesignated for the 80th Artillery Regiment on 21 November 1958. The insignia was redesignated effective 1 September 1971, for the 80th Field Artillery Regiment.

Current configuration
 1st Battalion 80th Field Artillery Regiment (United States)
 2nd Battalion 80th Field Artillery Regiment (United States)
 3rd Battalion 80th Field Artillery Regiment (United States)
 4th Battalion 80th Field Artillery Regiment (United States)
 5th Battalion 80th Field Artillery Regiment (United States)
 6th Battalion 80th Field Artillery Regiment (United States)

See also
 Field Artillery Branch (United States)

References

 https://web.archive.org/web/20110722213614/http://www.tioh.hqda.pentagon.mil/Heraldry/ArmyDUISSICOA/ArmyHeraldryUnit.aspx?u=3457

External links
 http://www.history.army.mil/html/forcestruc/lineages/branches/fa/default.htm 

080